Rosefield Township is located in Peoria County, Illinois. At the 2010 census, its population was 1,217 and it contained 489 housing units.

Geography

Demographics

References

External links
 City-data.com
 Illinois State Archives

Townships in Peoria County, Illinois
Peoria metropolitan area, Illinois
Townships in Illinois